Grigory Menshenin (born 8 March 1969) is a Russian cross-country skier. He competed in the men's 50 kilometre freestyle event at the 1998 Winter Olympics.

References

1969 births
Living people
Russian male cross-country skiers
Olympic cross-country skiers of Russia
Cross-country skiers at the 1998 Winter Olympics
Place of birth missing (living people)